Eric Rashard Buckner (born April 26, 1990) is an American professional basketball player for BC Wolves of the Lithuanian Basketball League (LKL). Buckner finished his NCAA basketball career playing for Georgia State.

Collegiate career
Buckner played two seasons for junior college, Gulf Coast State College, before transferring to finish his career at Georgia State University. He was named the 2012 Atlanta Tip-off Club Georgia Men's College Player of the Year.

College statistics

(*)Full statistical records from these seasons have not yet been found

College records
 All-time Georgia State University leader in blocked shots (in just two seasons): 167
 Single-season Georgia State University leader in blocked shots: 118, 2011–12
 Single-game Gulf Coast State College leader in field goal percentage: .1000 (7–7), 2008–09

Professional career
Buckner's professional career began with Uşak Sportif at Turkey in 2012. Until 2015, he spend 3 seasons for Uşak Sportif and İstanbul BB in Turkey as well.

In 2015, Buckner joined the Celtics summer league roster alongside another former GSU Panther, R. J. Hunter. On January 14, 2017, Buckner signed with the Turkish team Demir İnşaat Büyükçekmece.

On December 9, 2018, he has signed with As Monaco of the LNB Pro A.

On August 13, 2020, he has signed with Élan Chalon of the LNB Pro A.

On August 14, 2021, Buckner signed with Afyon Belediye of the Turkish Basketbol Süper Ligi.

On April 26, 2022, Buckner signed with BC Zenit Saint Petersburg of the VTB United League.

On July 23, 2022, he has signed with Sigortam.net İTÜ BB of the TBL.

On December 30, 2022, Bucker signed with BC Wolves of the Lithuanian Basketball League (LKL).

The Basketball Tournament
In 2017, Buckner played for the Kentucky Kings of The Basketball Tournament. Buckner averaged 12.5 PPG and 7.0 RPG to help his team advance to the second round of the tournament. The Basketball Tournament is a $2 million winner-take-all annual tournament broadcast on ESPN.

Personal life
Eric Buckner is the son of April Aikens and Sylvester Buckner. He majored in sociology at Georgia State University.

References

External links
Eric Buckner FIBA Profile (Game Center)
Eric Buckner Champions League Profile
Eric Buckner TBLStat.net Profile
Eric Buckner Eurobasket.com Profile
Eric Buckner GBL Profile
Eric Buckner Georgia State College Bio

1990 births
Living people
Afyonkarahisar Belediyespor players
American expatriate basketball people in China
American expatriate basketball people in Greece
American expatriate basketball people in Lithuania
American expatriate basketball people in Turkey
American men's basketball players
Aris B.C. players
AS Monaco Basket players
Basketball players from South Carolina
BC Wolves players
Büyükçekmece Basketbol players
Centers (basketball)
Georgia State Panthers men's basketball players
İstanbul Büyükşehir Belediyespor basketball players
Junior college men's basketball players in the United States
People from Bamberg County, South Carolina
Power forwards (basketball)
Türk Telekom B.K. players
Uşak Sportif players